Edith Dalton-James MBE CD (February 1, 1896 – November 5, 1976) was a Jamaican educator and politician. She was a founding member of the People's National Party (1938), and the first woman to become president of the Jamaica Union of Teachers in 1949.

Early life and education
Dalton-James was born on February 1, 1896, in Townhead, Westmoreland. She was the daughter of John William Dalton and Jeanette Dalton (née Walcott). She attended Shortwood Teachers College from 1911 to 1914. She also attended the Institute of Education, University of London.

Education career
Dalton-James worked as a teacher at Unity and Half Way Tree schools, prior to serving as principal of Chetolah Park Primary School beginning in 1951. She was a schoolteacher for forty years, twenty of which she spent at Chetolah Park. She served four terms as president of the Jamaican Union of Teachers (JUT), and was elected three times as president of the Caribbean Union of Teachers. Dalton-James was instrumental in the development of the Jamaica Teachers' Association. She was the first woman and first classroom teacher to become president of the JUT in 1949.

Political career
In 1938, Osmond Theodore Fairclough, Norman Manley, Dalton-James, and others, founded the People's National Party (PNP). She was subsequently made a life member of the PNP in 1962. Dalton-James first entered representational politics immediately after the granting of universal adult suffrage in 1944. She ran two times unsuccessfully as a candidate for the House of Representatives from the constituency of Saint Andrew Western (1944 and 1949). She was appointed to the Legislative Council of Jamaica (Senate) in 1944 and served until 1949.

Honors and awards
In 1953, Dalton-James was awarded the Queen's Coronation Medal, and in 1958, she received the Order of the British Empire (MBE). In 1971, the University of the West Indies conferred on her the honorary Doctor of Laws, and in 1975, the Jamaican government awarded her the Order of Distinction (Commander Class). In 1977, a community complex on Slipe Pen Road, Kingston, was named in her honour. The Edith Dalton-James High School in St Andrew was also named in her honour.

Personal life and death
In 1919, Dalton-James married Spencer Wesley James, a teacher. The marriage produced a son (Seymour W. James, Jr.) and two daughters (Marebelle James Mowatt and Joyce James). Dalton-James died on November 5, 1976, at the age of 80.

References

1896 births
1976 deaths
People from Westmoreland Parish
Jamaican politicians
People's National Party (Jamaica) politicians